Deerfield is a village in Lenawee County in the U.S. state of Michigan. The population was 898 at the 2010 census. The village is located within Deerfield Township.

Deerfield was the birthplace of actor and philanthropist Danny Thomas.

History
Deerfield was first settled in 1826.  It was incorporated as a village in 1873.

Geography

Demographics

2010 census
As of the census of 2010, there were 898 people, 343 households, and 258 families residing in the village. The racial makeup of the village was 95.0% White, 0.4% African American, 0.9% Native American, 0.1% Asian, 0.4% from other races, and 3.1% from two or more races. Hispanic or Latino of any race were 4.1% of the population.

There were 343 households, of which 38.2% had children under the age of 18 living with them, 57.4% were married couples living together, 14.0% had a female householder with no husband present, 3.8% had a male householder with no wife present, and 24.8% were non-families. 21.6% of all households were made up of individuals, and 8.2% had someone living alone who was 65 years of age or older. The average household size was 2.62 and the average family size was 3.00.

The median age in the village was 38.4 years. 26.3% of residents were under the age of 18; 8.2% were between the ages of 18 and 24; 25.6% were from 25 to 44; 27% were from 45 to 64; and 12.9% were 65 years of age or older. The gender makeup of the village was 48.9% male and 51.1% female.

2000 census
As of the census of 2000, there were 1,005 people, 358 households, and 272 families residing in the village. The racial makeup of the village was 97.51% White, 0.10% African American, 0.10% Asian, 2.09% from other races, and 0.20% from two or more races. Hispanic or Latino of any race were 3.18% of the population.

There were 358 households, out of which 42.7% had children under the age of 18 living with them, 61.5% were married couples living together, 9.5% had a female householder with no husband present, and 24.0% were non-families. 20.4% of all households were made up of individuals, and 11.2% had someone living alone who was 65 years of age or older.  The average household size was 2.81 and the average family size was 3.25.

In the village the population was spread out, with 31.2% under the age of 18, 8.2% from 18 to 24, 30.2% from 25 to 44, 19.8% from 45 to 64, and 10.5% who were 65 years of age or older.  The median age was 32 years. For every 100 females, there were 94.4 males.  For every 100 females age 18 and over, there were 89.3 males.

The median income for a household in the village was $49,276, and the median income for a family was $54,375. Males had a median income of $42,656 versus $24,444 for females. The per capita income for the village was $19,569.  About 3.0% of families and 5.3% of the population were below the poverty line, including 5.1% of those under age 18 and 1.0% of those age 65 or over.

Education

The Village of Deerfield is home to the Deerfield Public School District, often shortened to Deerfield schools. Deerfield's mascot is the Minutemen. The school covers the area of Deerfield and also attracts many students from surrounding cities, villages and townships for various personal, academic and athletic reasons.

The school is located at 252 Deerfield Highway. There is one building in Deerfield, which provides for the students in K-12.

As of the 2009–2010 school year, all Deerfield athletics are part of a cooperative sports program where Deerfield Schools and
Britton Schools combine to make athletic teams. When these two schools combine teams they are known as Britton/Deerfield or BD and adopted the mascot "Patriots" in 2008 thanks to the push for a mascot by parents of students in the program. The BD Patriots participate in the Tri-County Conference; which includes teams from Clinton, Madison, Morenci, Sand Creek, Summerfield, Whiteford, and Whitmore Lake schools.

For the 2010–2011 school year, both the Britton-Macon and Deerfield school boards voted to adopt a "shared services" plan for their middle school and high school students. All middle school students (6-8) from both districts will attend classes in Deerfield while high schoolers (9-12) will attend classes in Britton. Both school buildings will maintain their current elementary classes.

Along with the resolution, the school boards also moved to consolidate the districts. Official ballot language was finalized and placed on the ballot in both districts on August 3, 2010. The support was overwhelming and consolidation passed 652–174. The school districts officially became one district on July 1, 2011.

Gallery

References

External links

Deerfield Public Schools Website
Village of Deerfield Website

Villages in Lenawee County, Michigan
Villages in Michigan
1873 establishments in Michigan
Populated places established in 1873